Motichur railway station lies on the Northern railway network of Indian Railways.

Location
The station is situated in Bhupatwala, Haridwar, Uttarakhand, India. The road distance between Motichur railway station and Haridwar Junction railway station is 5 km.

Reduced level
The RL of the station is 313.95 m above mean sea level.

Signage
The station signage are predominantly in English and Hindi.

See also
Rishikesh

References

Railway stations in Haridwar district
Moradabad railway division
Buildings and structures in Haridwar
Year of establishment missing